Gnathothlibus eras is a moth of the  family Sphingidae.

Distribution 
It is known from the eastern Sunda Islands (from Java eastward), Sulawesi, the Moluccas, the Philippines, New Guinea, the Solomon Islands, Micronesia and eastern Australia.

Description

References

Gnathothlibus
Moths described in 1832